The 1978-79 NBA season was the Knicks' 33rd season in the NBA.

Draft picks

Roster

Regular season

Season standings

z - clinched division title
y - clinched division title
x - clinched playoff spot

Record vs. opponents

References

New York Knicks seasons
New York
New York Knicks
New York Knicks
1970s in Manhattan
Madison Square Garden